Graeme College is a public English medium high school for boys located in Makhanda (Grahamstown) in the  Eastern Cape province of South Africa. It caters for boys from Grade 00 to Grade 12 and offers both boarding and day options to its pupils. It was founded in April 1873.

History
Over the years the name of the school has undergone several changes. During the period in which it offered matriculation classes to young ladies, it was known as Victoria High School, and finally in 1938 it adopted the name "Graeme College".

Notable old boys

Professor Colin Bundy, historian.
William Philip Schreiner (1857-1919). 8th Prime Minister of the Cape Colony.
Squadron Leader Marmaduke Pattle, DFC and Bar.
Major-General Robert John (Bobby) Palmer CVO DSO.
Hennie le Roux, former South African (Springbok) centre (1993-1996).
William Philip Schreiner (1857-1919). 8th Prime Minister of the Cape Colony.
Daniel Cheeky Watson. Former Eastern Province and Junior Springbok rugby union player who, with his brother Valance, was one of the first white South African rugby union players to participate in a mixed race rugby game, during the period when mixed-race activities were forbidden by apartheid legislation.
The Very Rev. Harold Claude Noel Williams (1914-1990), Principal of St Matthew’s College

References

External links

http://ings.ds9.org.za/gallery/graeme Ingrid's Photo Gallery
http://www.martinsguesthouse.com/portalfred/graemeboys/ Martin Kruger's Old Boys Page

Schools in the Eastern Cape
Educational institutions established in 1873
Buildings and structures in Makhanda, Eastern Cape
1873 establishments in the Cape Colony